Major R. K. von Goldstein  was an Indian educationist.

Biography 
He studied in the Bishop Cotton School in Shimla where he was the house captain for Ibbetson House in 1927. After school he went on to study at Cambridge University. There also he was elected into the Hawks Club.

He was a Major in the British-Indian Army and was awarded the War Service Award. He was also made a Member of the Most Excellent Order of the British Empire.

He taught at Bishop Cotton in the nineteen-thirties and after that he went on to teach at Aitchison College in Lahore. He returned to Bishop Cotton as headmaster in 1963, a position he held until 1976. He is the only Old Cottonian who has been headmaster at the school.

In his memory, the school holds The Major R.K. Von Goldstein Memorial Cricket Tournament.

References

20th-century Indian educational theorists
Members of the Order of the British Empire
Academic staff of Aitchison College
Year of birth missing
Year of death missing